Riverdale is an American teen drama television series based on the characters of Archie Comics, which made its debut on January 26, 2017. The series was adapted for The CW by Archie Comics' chief creative officer Roberto Aguirre-Sacasa. A spin-off, titled Katy Keene and set between the fourth and fifth season of Riverdale, aired from February 6, 2020, to May 14, 2020.

Background
The series features an ensemble cast based on the characters off of the comic series, with KJ Apa in the role of Archie Andrews; Lili Reinhart as Betty Cooper, Camila Mendes as Veronica Lodge, and Cole Sprouse as Jughead Jones. The main cast also features Madelaine Petsch as Cheryl Blossom, Ashleigh Murray as Josie McCoy, Casey Cott as Kevin Keller, Ross Butler and Charles Melton as Reggie Mantle, Vanessa Morgan as Toni Topaz, Drew Ray Tanner as Fangs Fogarty, and Erinn Westbrook as Tabitha Tate. Other main characters in the series include the parents of the main characters: Luke Perry as Fred Andrews, Mädchen Amick as Alice Cooper, Marisol Nichols and Mark Consuelos as Hermione and Hiram Lodge, respectively, and Skeet Ulrich as F.P. Jones.

Overview
 Key
  Main cast (actor receives "Starring" credit that season) 
  Recurring cast (actor appears in three or more episodes that season)
  Guest cast (actor appears in one or two episodes that season)

Notes

Status
The following is a complete pictorial list of the characters. They are grouped by family, locations or groups.

 In production

Family tree

Main characters

Archie Andrews

Archibald "Archie" Andrews (portrayed by KJ Apa) is the son of Fred and Mary Andrews and ex boyfriend of Veronica Lodge. And later Betty's husband-to-be.
 
Archie is a student at Riverdale High School, a budding musician, and a football player for the Riverdale Bulldogs. His team number was number nine, given to him by Coach Clayton. This number was originally Jason Blossom's jersey, and so Archie took it upon himself to retire the jersey in Jason's honor and took the number seventeen in its place. Archie used to be the Captain of the football team but decided to defer his status as captain to Reggie Mantle after he felt more of an affinity with his music. Archie has been best friends with Jughead Jones and Betty Cooper since childhood. Betty develops feelings for Archie, which she ends up revealing to him in season 1. However, he does not reciprocate her feelings and decides to stay just friends with Betty, which causes minor temporary strain in their relationship. He instead is drawn to the new rich girl named Veronica, who had just moved to Riverdale from New York following the arrest of her wealthy billionaire father Hiram Lodge after he committed fraud and embezzlement.

Betty Cooper

Elizabeth "Betty" Cooper (portrayed by Lili Reinhart) is the daughter of Hal and Alice Cooper, sister of Polly Cooper, and aunt to Jason and Polly's twin incest babies, Juniper and Dagwood. And Archie's wife to - be.

Betty is a student at Riverdale High School and longtime best friend of Archie Andrews, Jughead Jones, Kevin Keller and new girl Veronica Lodge. She is also a River Vixen at Riverdale High, as well as an editor for the school's newspaper, The Blue and Gold. Betty's family life was very tense, as her mother was extremely controlling and sometimes emotionally abusive, which led to her sister having a mental breakdown and being sent to live in a group home run by nuns. Though her parents claimed this was caused by Polly's disastrous relationship with Jason Blossom, Betty knew better. As the only remaining daughter in the Cooper household, she was placed under immense pressure by her mother to be perfect in every way. During the process of investigating Jason Blossom's murder, she gets close to Jughead Jones and later on becomes his girlfriend. She also was the Serpent Queen in Season 3.

Veronica Lodge

Veronica Cecilia Lodge (Luna) (portrayed by Camila Mendes) is the daughter of Hiram and Hermione Lodge. She is the girlfriend of Archie Andrews and the ex-girlfriend of Reggie Mantle and wife of Reggie Mantle (In Rivervale).

Veronica is a student at Riverdale High School. In addition, she is a member of the River Vixens and Josie and the pussycats. She moved from New York to her mother's hometown of Riverdale due to her father's arrest and subsequent incarceration. She arrives in Riverdale in order to start over and leave her troubled past behind. While living in New York, Veronica was filthy rich, popular, and fashionable. She was also a bully and a mean girl. After her father is arrested, she and her mother Hermione are forced to flee New York City and relocate to Riverdale. She struggles to find the truth behind her father's loyalties and intentions, as she fears what will happen once he is released from prison and back home with them. Meanwhile, she is also trying to reform herself into a better person. She eventually develops friendships with all of the main characters including Betty Cooper, Jughead Jones, Josie McCoy, Cheryl Blossom and Kevin Keller. She becomes Archie Andrews' girlfriend and later on, Reggie Mantle's girlfriend. In season 2, Veronica's father Hiram is released from jail and moves back to Riverdale to join Hermione and Veronica as a family. After Hiram is released, Veronica gets involved in the Lodge family business. However, with time, she turns against her father and finally realizes what a horrible person he is despite constantly having blind faith in him the entire time. She is now an adversary to her father and spent the majority of the third season taking her father down and successfully having him put in prison for all of the crimes he has committed in Riverdale. Though believed to have been the only child of her father Hiram, it's later on revealed that she has an older paternal half-sister named Hermosa Lodge, who is making her first appearance in the fourth season.

Jughead Jones

Forsythe Pendleton "Jughead" Jones III (portrayed by Cole Sprouse) is the son of F.P. and Gladys Jones, half-brother of Charles Smith, older brother of Jellybean Jones and the boyfriend of Betty Cooper.

Jughead was a sophomore at Riverdale High School, he started investigating the murder of Jason Blossom with Betty Cooper and later on becomes her boyfriend, but after the arrest of his father, F.P. Jones, the leader of the Southside Serpents, he was placed into foster care and had to transfer to Southside High. While attending the gang and drug-infested high school, he re-opened the school newspaper, The Red and Black, where he was an editor, alongside new recruit, Toni Topaz, the newspaper's photographer, with Robert Phillips, their adviser until his arrest. However, with the closing of Southside High, Jughead has returned to Riverdale High. He is a close friend of Archie Andrews and Betty Cooper. He is also a member of the Southside Serpents, which he joined following his father's arrest, despite being advised against it.

Cheryl Blossom

Cheryl Marjorie Blossom (portrayed by Madelaine Petsch) is the daughter of Clifford and Penelope Blossom, twin sister of Jason Blossom, and the aunt to Jason and Polly's twin babies. She eventually becomes Toni Topaz's girlfriend.

Cheryl is a student at Riverdale High School, head cheerleader of the River Vixens and the self-proclaimed Queen Bee at Riverdale High School. Cheryl's relationship with her family seemed to be quite strained ever since Jason's death. Her mother blamed her for assisting Jason in his attempt to run away from Riverdale, which eventually led to his demise. Cheryl's father thinks of her as a train wreck in comparison to Jason, who was considered the "Golden Boy". Cheryl eventually develops romantic feelings for South-side Serpent Toni Topaz, whom she grows close to after they see a movie together.

Hermione Lodge

Hermione Apollonia Lodge (née Gomez) (portrayed by Marisol Nichols) is the ex-wife of Hiram Lodge and the mother of Veronica Lodge.

Hermione grew up in Riverdale and she came from a poor, working class Latino family. During that time, she would date Fred Andrews. However, she found herself drawn and attracted to Hiram Lodge, the wealthy boy whom her mother didn't approve of her dating because she felt he was a scrub and not decent for her daughter despite his wealth. Hermione found herself in a love triangle with Fred and Hiram in high school, but in the end, she ultimately chose Hiram over Fred. Throughout her high school years, Hermione worked at local businesses such as the Bijou and Spiffany's. During her youth, some would have described Hermione as a mean girl, but flashbacks suggest that she was a rebelling Catholic girl who wore glasses and a Catholic school girl uniform. She even believes her current misfortune was karma finally catching up to her. After she broke up with Fred, she married Hiram Lodge and the two moved to New York City. Together they had a daughter, Veronica. After Hiram was arrested for fraud and embezzlement, Hermione and Veronica fled New York City and moved back to Riverdale. After the scandal, the only remaining property that was not seized because it was in Hermione's name was the luxurious apartment building, the Pembrooke, where she resides with her husband and daughter. In season 2, Hermione runs for Mayor of Riverdale. She ends up winning the election, beating out Fred Andrews by a smidge. As of season 2, she is the current Mayor of Riverdale. In season 3, Hermione appoints FP Jones as the Sheriff of Riverdale after hiring FP to shoot Hiram.

Josie McCoy

Josephine "Josie" McCoy (portrayed by Ashleigh Murray) is the daughter of Myles and Sierra McCoy.

Josie is a student at Riverdale High School and was both the lead singer and guitarist of her band, Josie and the Pussycats. After she secretly made the decision to pursue a solo career, Valerie Brown and Melody Valentine disbanded the group. Her father, who was a man of music, gave her the name Josephine, after the late singer Josephine Baker. Because of this, she often struggles to gain his approval while also trying to impress him. Unlike her father, Josie's mother Sierra is far more encouraging of her talents, especially where her band and music are concerned. They both enforce "black excellence", especially when the choice of the band members are concerned.

Alice Cooper

Alice Susanna Cooper (née Smith) (portrayed by Mädchen Amick) is the ex-wife of Hal Cooper, mother of Charles Smith, Betty, and Polly Cooper, the grandmother of Jason and Polly's twin babies and the editor and co-owner of the local newspaper The Riverdale Register.

Alice grew up on the south side of Riverdale and attended the local high school with Hermione Lodge, Fred Andrews, FP Jones, Penelope Blossom, Hal Cooper, Hiram Lodge, Mary Andrews, Tom Keller and Sierra McKoy.

Fred Andrews

Frederick Arthur "Fred" Andrews (portrayed by Luke Perry) was the ex-husband of Mary Andrews, father of Archie Andrews and the owner of Andrews Construction.

Fred was raised in Riverdale, and like his son, attended the local high school, where he was close friends with F.P. Jones, Alice Cooper,  Hermione Lodge, Penelope Blossom, Hal Cooper, Hiram Lodge, Mary Andrews, Tom Keller and Sierra McKoy, and briefly dated Hermione until she chose the rich kid, Hiram over him. During those high school years, Fred and F.P. spent an entire summer fixing up an old DW bus, which they later came to called "The Shaggin' Wagon". Following that, he and F.P. formed a band their senior year, which they named "The Fred Heads". Apparently, this attracted the attention of a lot of ladies for Fred. He later went on to marry Mary Andrews and she would give birth to their first and only child, Archie Andrews. However, that did not last. He and Mary separated, which was not amicable as the two had trouble being in the same room together without a mediator present and Mary moved away to Chicago.

Luke Perry died of a stroke in March 2019, and as a result Fred Andrews died in a hit-and-run while assisting a stranger.

Hiram Lodge

Hiram Lodge (born Jaime Luna) (portrayed by Mark Consuelos) is the ex-husband of Hermione Lodge, father of Hermosa and Veronica Lodge and the CEO and President of Lodge Industries.

Hiram supposedly grew up in Riverdale, where he was known as the filthy rich kid. During this time, he dated Hermione Gomez, who broke up with Fred Andrews to be with him. Along with building a relationship with Hermione, he forged a rivalry with Clifford Blossom during his high school years. It was later revealed that while attending Riverdale High School, Hiram was the wrestling state champion, earning him a trophy for his great achievement. After graduating, he and Hermione moved to New York City, and some time later got married and had a daughter, Veronica, and they all lived together in New York living a wealthy, luxurious lifestyle. However, their fancy life and luxurious living did not last forever as Hiram was arrested for fraud and embezzlement. Despite his imprisonment, Hiram still ran his businesses and criminal empire from behind bars. He has been released from prison and has now taken up residence at the Pembrooke in Riverdale with his wife and daughter. Since his release, he has secretly purchased Pop's Chock'lit Shoppe, hiring Pop Tate as manager in exchange for his silence. Hiram is also business partners with Fred Andrews, working on the SoDale project together, an arrangement that was put in place by Hermione, in an effort to legitimize Lodge Industries. He has also taken over Riverdale by purchasing all of the businesses and lands within the town, including Southside High (which he had intended to use to build his for profit prison), the Riverdale Register, and Sunnyside Trailer Park just to name a few. He also intended to have Fred Andrews run for Mayor of Riverdale but when he declined to run under the Lodge's request, he had his wife Hermione run for Mayor instead. Hiram's intention of having Hermione run for Mayor was so that he could have complete control over Riverdale with an iron fist. Hiram continues to operate his devious schemes and have control over Riverdale until eventually, it all comes crashing down in season three. Hiram ends up being arrested by Sheriff FP Jones and he is imprisoned in the very prison that he built and becomes its first inmate. Despite being in prison, Hiram is still able to manipulate things to his own accord as he had Hermione arrested by the FBI to get back at her and Veronica for betraying him. In addition to being a very wealthy, powerful business man, Hiram is also a crime boss and a drug lord. Throughout season 2 and 3, Hiram has successfully been peddling Fizzle Rocks and Jingle Jangle throughout Riverdale. In season 4, it is revealed that Hiram has another daughter named Hermosa Lodge whom he has kept hidden and secret.

Consuelos joined the series in the second season.

Kevin Keller

Kevin Keller (portrayed by Casey Cott) is the son of Tom and Mrs. Keller.

Kevin is a sophomore at Riverdale High School and the best friend of Betty Cooper. Along with that, he has become Veronica's G.B.F. (gay best friend). Kevin also struggles with his sexuality, as he does not have the same options as his friends do. Because of this, it often causes Kevin to act recklessly at times. He has dated Joaquin, as well as had some interaction with Moose Mason, but Joaquin left Riverdale, forcing their break-up and Moose is unwilling to be "out" like Kevin, forcing him to resort to other means in order to feel something. But lately, Kevin has revealed strong feelings towards Moose, that were either rejected or unnoticed.

In the second-season finale, after Moose is upset about the death of Midge, he and Moose share a kiss.

Cott was promoted to the main cast for the second season after recurring in the first.

F.P. Jones

Forsythe Pendleton "F.P." Jones II (portrayed by Skeet Ulrich) is the ex-husband of Gladys Jones, father of Jughead and Jellybean Jones and Charles Smith Jones, and the leader of the Southside Serpents.

F.P. grew up in Riverdale and attended Riverdale High School with best friend Fred Andrews, Mary Andrews, Penelope Blossom, Alice Cooper, Hal Cooper and Hermione Lodge. At the age of sixteen, F.P.'s father kicked him out of the house and "told him to go to hell". Instead, he joined the Southside Serpents, who accepted him as one of their own. Soon thereafter, he enlisted in the army. After serving his country, F.P. returned to Riverdale, picking up from where he left off with the Serpents; however, he later retired and gave the place of king and queen to Jughead and Betty 
. F.P. and Fred Andrews later went on to found a construction company together, but barely made enough to stay in business. By that time, F.P. had married and become a father to two young children, whom he and his wife would frequently take to the Twilight Drive-In-however, they often could not afford tickets for everyone, so the kids would hide in the trunk until they parked. While Fred had his wife and son, Archie, to provide for, F.P. had his family as well as many hospital bills. Due to this, F.P. became involved in a string of criminal activities which would often end with him getting arrested and Fred having to bail him out. Eventually, he became too big of a liability for their company and was forced by Fred to resign. After losing his job, F.P. began drinking heavily, which led the Jones family to fall apart. F.P.'s wife left him and took their daughter with her to Toledo to live with the kids' grandparents, and Jughead began living out of the projection booth of the drive-in, where he had found employment. F.P. ended up living alone at the Sunnyside Trailer Park, where he continued drinking. At an unknown point, F.P. became the leader of the Southside Serpents, a dangerous biker gang of thugs and criminals. In the third season, he becomes the Sheriff of Riverdale after being appointed the position by Mayor Lodge. He is currently in a live-in relationship with his high-school sweetheart, Alice Cooper.

Ulrich was promoted to the main cast for the second season after recurring in the first.

Reggie Mantle

Reginald "Reggie" Mantle (portrayed by Ross Butler (season 1) and Charles Melton (Season 2 to present) is Archie's long-time friend and rival, a football player at Riverdale High School and town prankster. He and Veronica started dating after Archie left however after his return Veronica felt guilty and didn't want a relationship with Reggie any longer, but they eventually got back together. Butler left the series after the first season owing to his commitments as a member of the main cast on 13 Reasons Why; Melton was cast to take over the role of Reggie in the second season on a recurring basis and was promoted to the main cast in the third season.

Antoinette "Toni" Topaz 

Antoinette "Toni" Topaz Fogarty (portrayed by Vanessa Morgan) is a bisexual member of the South-side Serpents, who befriends Jughead Jones in the second season. She is in a relationship with Cheryl Blossom in Season Two. While as also being Fangs' wife she's also Anthony's mother Morgan was promoted to the main cast in the third season. She is planned to have more screen time from season 5.

Fangs Fogarty
Fangs Fogarty (portrayed by Drew Ray Tanner) is a member of the Southside Serpents, who was good friends with Joaquin, and befriends Jughead and eventually starts dating Kevin and breaks up with him. He's also Toni's Husband and Anthony's Father

Tabitha Tate
Tabitha Tate (portrayed by Erinn Westbrook) is the ambitious, entrepreneurial granddaughter of Pop Tate, who has come to town to take over Pop's Chock'lit Shoppe in the hopes of franchising the iconic diner. She is also the current girlfriend of Jughead.

Recurring characters

Introduced in season one
 Martin Cummins as Tom Keller: The town's police sheriff and Kevin's father.
 Robin Givens as Sierra McCoy: The Mayor of Riverdale and Josie's mother.
 Nathalie Boltt as Penelope Blossom: Cheryl and Jason's mother.
 Lochlyn Munro as Hal Cooper: Polly and Betty's father, and Alice Cooper's ex-husband.
 Colin Lawrence as Floyd Clayton: Chuck's father, and coach of Riverdale Bulldogs Football Team.
 Peter James Bryant as Waldo Weatherbee: The principal at Riverdale High School.
 Sarah Habel as Geraldine Grundy: The young music teacher at Riverdale High School, who had a sexual relationship with Archie over the summer. It is revealed in the fourth episode of the first season that Grundy moved to Riverdale after changing her name from Jennifer Gibson after her divorce, to escape from an abusive relationship. Since then Grundy has moved from Riverdale to avoid police capture because of her relationship with Archie. She is then murdered by the black hood in series 2
 Jordan Calloway as Chuck Clayton: A football-star jock at Riverdale High School.
 Rob Raco as Joaquin DeSantos: The youngest member of the Southside Serpents, who finds himself tied between a romantic relationship with Kevin.
 Asha Bromfield as Melody Valentine: The drummer for the popular band Josie and the Pussycats.
 Cody Kearsley as Marmaduke "Moose" Mason: Archie's bisexual jock friend, who propositions Kevin.
 Hayley Law as Valerie Brown: The songwriter, bassist, and backup vocalist for the popular band Josie and the Pussycats and Archie's ex-girlfriend.
 Shannon Purser as Ethel Muggs: A victim of Chuck Clayton's slut-shaming, who also faces problems with her father's condition due to Hiram Lodge.
 Trevor Stines as Jason Blossom: Cheryl's twin brother, whose murder hangs over the town of Riverdale.
 Olivia Ryan Stern as Tina Patel: The super-smart little sister of Archie Comics character Raj Patel, and one of Cheryl's best friends.
 Caitlin Mitchell-Markovitch as Ginger Lopez: One of Cheryl's best friends.
 Major Curda as Dilton Doiley: The leader of the town's troop of Ranger Scouts. Daniel Yang portrayed Dilton in the pilot.
 Tiera Skovbye as Polly Cooper: Betty's older sister, and the daughter of Alice and Hal Cooper. She is pregnant with Jason Blossom's children.
 Barclay Hope as Clifford Blossom: Cheryl and Jason's father.
 Barbara Wallace as Roseanne "Rose" Blossom: Cheryl and Jason's grandmother.
 Alvin Sanders as Pop Tate: The owner of the local diner, Pop's Chock'lit Shoppe.
 Tom McBeath as Smithers: The Lodge family butler.
 Molly Ringwald as Mary Andrews: Archie's mother, who left Archie and Fred for Chicago.
 Scott McNeil as Gerald "Tall Boy" Petite: F.P.'s right-hand man, who later becomes the de facto leader of the Southside Serpents.

Introduced in season two
 Emilija Baranac as Midge Klump: Moose's girlfriend and a member of the cheerleading squad at Riverdale High School.
 Brit Morgan as Penny Peabody: A member of the Southside Serpents, who blackmails Jughead.
 Stephan Miers as Andre: The Lodge family capo and personal assistant.
 Jordan Connor as Sweet Pea: A member of the Southside Serpents, who befriends Jughead.
 Graham Phillips as Nick St. Clair: A devious, trouble-making bad boy from Veronica's past, who comes to Riverdale looking to win her back.
 Tommy Martinez as Malachai: The leader of the Southside Serpents' rival gang, the Ghoulies.
 Cameron McDonald as Joseph Svenson: The janitor at Riverdale High School, and notably the only survivor of the Conway family massacre, which occurred forty years ago by the hands of the Riverdale Reaper.
 Beverley Breuer as Sister Woodhouse: The leader at the Sisters of Quiet Mercy.
 Hart Denton as Chic: An impostor who is initially believed to be the son of Alice and F.P.
 John Behlmann as Arthur Adams: Hermione Lodge's capo, who she tasked with applying pressure to Archie as a test to his loyalty.
 Barclay Hope as Claudius Blossom: Cheryl and Jason's uncle, and Clifford Blossom's estranged twin brother.
 Henderson Wade as Michael Minetta: The new police sheriff of the town, who takes over Keller's spot.
 Julian Haig as Elio Grande: A rich man, who seems to have a secret interest in Veronica Lodge, and tends to help her.

Introduced in season three
Matthew Yang King as Marty Mantle: Reggie Mantle's abusive father, and member of the Midnight Club. 
 Zoé De Grand Maison as Evelyn Evernever: Edgar's wife, who takes an interest in Betty.
 William MacDonald as Warden Norton: The Warden of the Leopold and Loeb Juvenile Detention Center.
 Link Baker as Captain Golightly: A Captain at the Leopold and Loeb Juvenile Detention Center.
 Nikolai Witschl as Dr. Curdle Jr.: A doctor who replaces his father Dr. Curdle after his death.
 Eli Goree as Mad Dog: Warden Norton's favorite inmate at the Leopold and Loeb Juvenile Detention Center until Archie arrives.
 Gina Gershon as Gladys Jones: F.P.'s ex-wife and the mother of Jughead and J.B.
 Trinity Likins as Forsythia Jellybean "J.B." Jones: Jughead's younger sister and the daughter of F.P. and Gladys.
Bernadette Beck as Peaches 'N Cream: A student at Riverdale High School and a member of the Pretty Poisons.
 Jonathan Whitesell as Kurtz: A student at Riverdale High School and a former member of the Southside Serpents and the Gargoyle Gang.
 Nico Bustamante as Ricardo "Ricky" DeSantos: Joaquin's younger brother and a member of the Gargoyle Gang.
 Chad Michael Murray as Edgar Evernever: Evelyn's father, and the enigmatic leader of the cult-like group called the Farm.
 Wyatt Nash as Charles Smith: An FBI agent and illegitimate son of Alice and F.P Jones.

Introduced in season four
 Kerr Smith as Mr. Holden Honey, the new principal of Riverdale High.
 Sam Witwer as Rupert Chipping, a teacher at Stonewall Prep, who recruits Jughead for the writing seminar.
 Sean Depner as Bret Weston Wallis, an insufferably competitive student at Stonewall Prep who targets Jughead when he enrolls at the prestigious school.
 Sarah Desjardins as Donna Sweett, a Student at Stonewall Prep.
 Mishel Prada as Hermosa Lodge, a private investigator from Miami. She is Hiram's illegitimate daughter, and Veronica's half-sister.
 Ryan Robbins as Frank Andrews, Fred Andrews' younger brother and Archie's uncle who returns to Riverdale.
 Malcolm Stewart as Francis Dupont, originator of the Baxter Brothers books series. It is later revealed that he bought the idea from Jughead's grandfather at Stonewall Prep.
 Timothy Webber as Forsythe Pendleton Jones I, father of F.P. Jones and grandfather of Jughead.

Introduced in season five
 Sommer Carbuccia as Eric Jackson, a corporal from the US Army who was saved by Archie during the war.
 Greyston Holt as Glen Scot, an FBI agent who appears to have a romantic relationship with Betty.
 Chris Mason as Chadwick "Chad" Gekko, Veronica's controlling and jealous husband who works on Wall Street. Mason replaces Reid Prebenda, who portrayed the character in Katy Keene where Chadwick was introduced.
 Adeline Rudolph as Minerva Marble, a persuasive art appraiser who is interested by the Blossom family's art collection.
 Zara Antwi as Baby Anthony Fogarty, Toni and Fangs son who was previously Kevin and Fangs' son but due to Kevin and Fangs' separation  Toni and Fangs took full custody over him.

Introduced in season six

Anthony Fogarty 
Anthony Fogarty (Portrayed by Will Jackson), Toni and Fangs' teenage son, who as an infant/baby was Kevin and Fangs' son but due to Kevin and Fangs' separation Toni and Fangs took full custody over him and soon thereafter Toni and Fangs got married and now became his official biological parents, Hence, as to why his surname is the same as Fangs' surname.

Guest characters

Introduced in season one
 Mackenzie Gray as Dr. Curdle: A doctor who helps Alice Cooper by showing her autopsies.
 Adain Bradley as Trev Brown: Valerie's younger brother.
 Raúl Castillo as Oscar Castillo: A successful songwriter from New York.
 Reese Alexander as Myles McCoy: Josie's father and Sierra's ex-husband.
 Alison Araya as Ms. Weiss: A Social Services worker who was handed Jughead's case.

Introduced in season two
 M. C. Gainey as Paul "Poppa Poutine" Boucher: One of Hiram's business associates.
 Harrison MacDonald as Cassidy Bullock: A man who is killed by Andre; however, Archie is later framed by Hiram Lodge as his murderer.
 Azura Skye as Darla: A woman who threatens Alice and Betty to give her money as a form of debt from Chic.
 Andre Tricoteux as "Small Fry" Boucher: Paul "Poppa Poutine" Boucher's son, who comes to Riverdale to get revenge on the Lodges for his father's murder.

Introduced in season three
 Penelope Ann Miller as Ms. Wright: The district attorney in charge of prosecuting Archie's murder case.
 Simon C. Hussey as Marcus Mason: Moose's father, and the RROTC instructor.
 Connor Paton as Brandon "Baby Teeth" Morris: An inmate at the Leopold and Loeb Juvenile Detention Center.
 Matthew Yang King as Marty Mantle: Reggie's father, and an alumnus of Riverdale High School.
 Kelly Ripa as Mrs. Mulwray: Hiram Lodge's alleged mistress, who finds herself deeply involved in a conspiracy.
  Darcy Hinds as Randy Ronson: Elio Grande's fighter, who fights Archie in the ring.
 Anna Van Hooft as Ms. Ronson: Randy Ronson's sister, who blames Archie for the death of her brother.

Introduced in season five
 AC Bonifacio as Star Vixen
 Zara Antwi as Baby Anthony Fogarty, Toni and Fangs son who was previously Kevin and Fangs' son but due to Kevin and Fangs' separation  Toni and Fangs took full custody over him.

Introduced in season six 

 Ace Rudy Allan Carter as Baby Anthony Fogarty, Toni and Fangs son who was previously Kevin and Fangs' son but due to Kevin and Fangs' separation  Toni and Fangs took full custody over him.

Crossover guest characters 
 Ty Wood as Billy Marlin: A jock from Greendale. Billy appeared in "Chapter Sixty-Seven: Varsity Blues" from season four and is a character from Chilling Adventures of Sabrina.
 Lucy Hale as Katy Keene: An aspiring fashion designer from New York City and Veronica's friend. Katy appeared in "Chapter Sixty-Nine: Men of Honor" from season four and is a character from Katy Keene. The character also made a vocal cameo in "Chapter Eighty-Four: Lock & Key" from season five.
 Zane Holtz as K.O. Kelly: A boxer and Katy's longtime boyfriend. K.O. appeared in "Chapter Seventy-Seven: Climax" from season five, and in "Chapter One Hundred and Five: Folk Heroes" from season six. He is a character from Katy Keene.
 Ryan Faucett as Bernardo Bixby: A firefighter from New York City. Bernardo appeared in "Chapter Eighty-Three: Fire in the Sky" from season five and is a character from Katy Keene.
 Camille Hyde as Alexandra "Xandra" Cabot: A powerful New York socialite and the senior vice president of Cabot Entertainment. Alexandra appeared in "Chapter Ninety-One: The Return of the Pussycats" from season five and "Chapter One Hundred and Seventeen: Night of the Comet" from season six is a character from Katy Keene.
 Kiernan Shipka as Sabrina Spellman: A half-human, half-witch teenager from Greendale and the Dark Lord's daughter. Sabrina appeared in "Chapter Ninety-Nine: The Witching Hour(s)" and "Chapter One Hundred and Fourteen: The Witches of Riverdale" from season six and is a character from Chilling Adventures of Sabrina.
 The character of Nicholas "Nick" Scratch also appeared in "Chapter One Hundred and Fourteen: The Witches of Riverdale", portrayed by Cole Sprouse. Nick is a character from Chilling Adventures of Sabrina. Gavin Leatherwood portrayed the character in Sabrina. In Riverdale, Sabrina resurrected him using Jughead's body.

References

Riverdale (2017 TV series)

Comics characters in television
Lists of American drama television series characters
Lists of teen drama characters
2010s television-related lists